Liping may refer to:

Liping County (黎平县), a county in Guizhou, China 	
Liping, Gansu (黎坪镇), a town in Wen County, Gansu, China
Liping Township, Hunan (栗坪乡), a township in Mayang Miao Autonomous County, Hunan, China

See also
Li Ping (disambiguation)